Transformers: Escape is an American comic book limited series set thart was released in December 2020 by IDW Publishing. Based on the Transformers franchise by Hasbro and Takara-Tomy, the series is a spin-off from the 2019 mainline comic book, set parallelly during the events of issues #25–30.

The series debuted on December 30, 2020, and concluded on July 7, 2021.

Premise 
After the Decepticons reveal their scheme to rule Cybertron, chaos reigns and countless civilians, being Cybertronians and other alien species, are caught in the crossfire. Therefore, Wheeljack reunites several scientists to reactivate the Ark project and transport all those people away.

Publication history

Background 
Transformers was first announced by IDW Publishing on December 18, 2018. The title is written by Brian Ruckley, and was initially illustrated by Angel Hernandez and Cachét Whitman, and started publishing issues twice-monthly in March 2019. Ruckley described the writing opportunity as a "privilege", and stated that the title would be a great opportunity for new readers to familiarize themselves with the universe and characters of the Transformers franchise, which he describes as of the "biggest [and] best that science fiction has to offer".

Development 
In September 2020, IDW announced the Transformers spin-off series titled Transformers: Escape to be released in December 2020. The series is written by Brian Ruckley and drawn by Bethany McGuire-Smith.

Rucley says "Escape's a cocktail of what I love most about Transformers, with some of my favorite characters and a few surprise guest stars caught up in a pretty epic escalation. I've always thought it would be a pretty terrifying, bewildering experience for aliens – non-Cybertronians – to be caught between warring factions of big transforming robots. We're exploring the question: Who are the most dangerous Cybertronians of all?"

McGuire-Smith says "I'm excited to be working on this awesome chapter in the Transformers storyline. From the perspective of Hound and Wheeljack, we will see what matters most when so many lives are on the line… and whom they can really trust as multiple threats rise."

IDW editor David Mariotte says "From the launch in 2019, the Transformers universe that's unfolded in the ongoing series and in Transformers: Galaxies has been about showing Cybertronians from exciting new perspectives. That's why we're thrilled to have Brian Ruckley and Beth McGuire-Smith reuniting to dig into the lives of faces both new and familiar as war breaks out and how they respond to the other inhabitants of Cybertron."

The series concluded on July 7, 2021, after five issues.

Issues

Reception 
The initial issue received a 6.7 critic rating out of 5 reviews. Charles Hartford from But Why Tho? said it "setups an interesting story, while taking some time to get a bit philosophical with its title characters. If you have either read the previous stories this series spins off of, or don't mind not having all the details, this book is an enjoyable beginning for a new tale".

Collected edition

References

Notes

Footnotes

External links 
 IDW Publishing's official announcement

IDW Publishing titles
2020 comics debuts
Escape